Henry Davidson may refer to:

 Henry Brevard Davidson (1831–1899), officer in the United States Army
 Henry Alexander Davidson (1905–1973), American physician, psychiatric administrator and proponent of forensic psychiatry

See also
 Henry Sheldon (Henry Davidson Sheldon, 1874–1948), American educator and historian
 Henry Davison (disambiguation)